Arvo Närvänen (12 February 1905 – 4 April 1982) was a Finnish footballer. He competed in the men's tournament at the 1936 Summer Olympics. He played a bulk of his club career Viipurin Sudet. From 1931 to 1936 he played in newly formed Mestaruussarja. In his later career he also played for Simpeleen Urheilijat in lower divisions.

References

External links

1905 births
1982 deaths
Finnish footballers
Finland international footballers
Olympic footballers of Finland
Footballers at the 1936 Summer Olympics
Sportspeople from Vyborg
Association football defenders
Sudet players